George Beauchamp Knowles (1790–1862) was an English botanist and a professor at the Royal School of Medicine and Surgery of Birmingham. He worked in close cooperation with Frederic Westcott on the taxonomy of orchids.

He was a member of the Botanical Society of London. His author abbreviation in botanical nomenclature is Knowles.

Publications
 1838. Knowles, GB; F Westcott. The Floral Cabinet & Magazine of Exotic Botany. 3 vols.

References

External links

English botanists
Orchidologists
Botanists with author abbreviations
1790 births
1862 deaths
19th-century British botanists